Storm Weather Shanty Choir is a Norwegian sextet from Stord, Norway that performs mostly traditional Norwegian and English sea shanties. They were formed in 2000, by shantyman Haakon Steinar Vatle, and used to introduce themselves as "the roughest, toughest and youngest boy band in Norway, singing 150 years old cover songs".

Storm Weather Shanty Choir celebrated its 20th anniversary in 2020.
The Storm Weather Shanty Choir is known for its hefty and inclusive concerts and a mention from a concert in Seattle in 2009 can be descriptive: »The Storm Weather Shanty Choir is like imagine Gogol Bordello singing shanties»

Last year, the band’s six albums were streamed three million times around the world. Since 2010, the band has been on three nationwide tours in Norway, two US-tours and three Japanese tours, in addition to concerts in Denmark, Sweden, Switzerland, the Netherlands, Germany , England and Scotland.

Sailboat shipmate Haakon Steinar Vatle founded the Storm Weather Shanty Choir after sailing the seas on 3-masted tall ship “SS Statsraad Lehmkuhl”. Haakon Steinar Vatle returned home to the island Stord on the wild, beautiful and stormy western coast of Norway, and gathered a bunch of long-haired rockers to combine his love and living interest in maritime history, culture of tall ships and shanties. As rockers simply are a sort of landbound seamen, main Shantyman Vatle found his fellowship with Roald Kaldestad, Gisle Østrem, Vidar Vedå, Ronny Sætre and Rune Nesse.

The Storm Weather Shanty Choir is known for its hefty and inclusive concerts  - and like all finer things of life worth experiencing, it seems they only get better as they age. The choir is known as a colourful element in both the folk music communities and in more rock-oriented music-scenes alike, and their fun and engaging shows are a definite must-see for all music-lovers.

Line up:

Haakon Steinar Vatle - Shantyman, lead singer and guitar
Gisle Østrem - Lyrical tenor and bass accordion
Roald Kaldestad - Lyrical tenor, mandolin and guitar
Ronny Sætre - Barytone
Rune Nesse - Bass and percussion
Vidar Vedå - Bass

Discography 
 2002 - Cheer Up Me Lads!
 2004 - Off to Sea Once More
 2005 - Let Us Be Jolly and Drown Melancholy!
 2009 - Way Hey (And Away We'll Go)
 2012 - A Drop of Nelson's Blood
 2017 - Live
 2021 - Nine Rows of Teeth

References 
 Shanty Choir
 OFFICIAL FACEBOOK PAGE

External links 
 Band website

Norwegian choirs
Maritime music
Boys' and men's choirs
Musical groups established in 2000
2000 establishments in Norway
Musical groups from Hordaland
Stord